The Bishop of Kilmore, Elphin and Ardagh  is the Ordinary of the Church of Ireland Diocese of Kilmore, Elphin and Ardagh in the Province of Armagh.

The present incumbent is the Right Revd Ferran Glenfield, who was elected, consecrated, and installed in 2013.

List of Bishops of Kilmore, Elphin and Ardagh

See also

 Bishop of Kilmore
 Bishop of Kilmore and Ardagh
 Bishop of Elphin
 Bishop of Ardagh

References

Kilmore, Elphin and Ardagh
Religion in County Cavan
Bishops of Kilmore or Elphin or of Ardagh
1841 establishments in Ireland